Breves is a Brazilian municipality located in the state of Pará, on the island of Marajó. Its population  is estimated to be 103,497 people. The area of the municipality is 9,550.454 km². The city belongs to the mesoregion Marajó and to the microregion of Furos de Breves.

The municipality is contained in the  Marajó Archipelago Environmental Protection Area, a sustainable use conservation unit established in 1989 to protect the environment of the delta region.
It contains the  Mapuá Extractive Reserve, a sustainable use conservation unit created in 2005.

The city is served by Breves Airport.

Climate 
The climate is tropical rainforest or equatorial (Köppen: Af) with high rainfall and high temperature all year round.

References

Municipalities in Pará